Georgi Mirtchev Adamov (born 3 June 1939) is a Bulgarian gymnast. He competed in the 1964 and 1968 Summer Olympics.

References

1939 births
Living people
Gymnasts at the 1964 Summer Olympics
Gymnasts at the 1968 Summer Olympics
Bulgarian male artistic gymnasts
Olympic gymnasts of Bulgaria
Gymnasts from Sofia